

Incumbents
President: Manuel Azaña
Prime Minister: Santiago Casares Quiroga until July 19, Francisco Largo Caballero

Events
July 17–18 - July 1936 military uprising in Melilla
July 18–25 - July 1936 military uprising in Seville
July 18–20 - Siege of Cuartel de la Montaña
July 19 - July 1936 military uprising in Barcelona
July 19–27 - Siege of Cuartel de Loyola
July 19-August 16 - Siege of Gijón
July 19-October 16 - Siege of Oviedo
July 20-23 - July 1936 coup d'état in Granada
July 21-September 27 - Siege of the Alcázar
August 14 - Battle of Badajoz (1936)
August 19-September 5 - Battle of Irún
September 3 - Battle of Talavera de la Reina (1936)

Births
7 March - Antonio Mercero, film director and screenwriter (b. 2018)
4 May - El Cordobés, matador
18 May - Francisco Laína, politician (b. 2022)

Deaths
July 12 - José Castillo (Spanish Civil War) (born 1901)
July 13 - José Calvo Sotelo (born 1893)
July 20 - José Sanjurjo (born 1872) and Francisco Ascaso (born 1901)
July 30 – Joaquín Abati (born 1865)
August 4 - Antonio Azarola y Gresillón (born 1874)
August 5
 José Manuel Puelles de los Santos (born 1894)
 Marcelino Valentín Gamazo (born 1879)
August 8 - Ceferino Giménez Malla (born 1861)
August 11 - Blas Infante (born 1885)
August 12 - Manuel Goded Llopis (born 1882)
August 17 - José María of Manila (born 1880) and Alexandre Bóveda (born 1903)
August 19 - Federico García Lorca (born 1898)
August 22 - Melquíades Álvarez (politician) (born 1864)
August 23 - Julio Ruiz de Alda Miqueleiz (born 1897) and José María Albiñana (born 1883)
August 31 - Joaquín Milans del Bosch (born 1854)
September 5 - Federico Borrell García (born 1912)
September 29 - Alfonso Beorlegui Canet (born 1888)
October 2 - Bartolomé Blanco (born 1914)
October 29 - Ramiro de Maeztu (born 1875) and Ramiro Ledesma Ramos (born 1905)
November 20 - Buenaventura Durruti (born 1896) and José Antonio Primo de Rivera (born 1903)
November 28 - Pedro Muñoz Seca (born 1879)

See also
List of Spanish films of the 1930s
Spanish Civil War

References

Bibliography
Thomas, Hugh. The Spanish Civil War. Penguin Books. 2001. London. 

 
1930s in Spain
Years of the 20th century in Spain